Karl Ferdinand von Buol (17 May 1797  – 28 October 1865) was an Austrian diplomatist and statesman, who served as Foreign Minister of Austrian Empire from 1852 to 1859.

Early life
Karl was born in Vienna, a scion of a Grisons noble family descending from Fürstenau. His father Count Johann Rudolf von Buol-Schauenstein (1763–1834) from 1816 until 1823 chaired the Austrian delegation to the Bundesversammlung of the German Confederation. His mother was Countess Alexandrine von und zu Lerchenfeld (b. 1769).

Biography

He joined the Austrian foreign service and served successively as envoy to Baden at Karlsruhe (1828–1838), to Württemberg at Stuttgart (1838–1844), to Sardinia-Piedmont at Turin (1844–1848), to Russia at Saint Petersburg (1848–1850), to the German ministerial conference at Dresden 1850/51, and to the United Kingdom at London (1851–1852). He became an increasingly close associate of the Austrian Minister-President, Prince Felix of Schwarzenberg, and when Schwarzenberg suddenly died in April 1852, Buol succeeded him as foreign minister, although not as Premier, as the young Emperor Franz Joseph himself now took a more direct role in directing cabinet affairs than he had previously.

As foreign minister, Buol soon had to deal with the Near Eastern crisis which had erupted by early 1854 into the Crimean War, as France and Britain had declared war on Russia in an effort to support the Ottoman Empire.  In this crisis, Austria's position was a tenuous one. Russia's intervention to suppress the Hungarian Revolution of 1848, and its subsequent intervention on behalf of Austria against Prussia leading to the Punctation of Olmütz in 1850, put the Austrians substantially in the debt of the Tsar Nicholas I.  Furthermore, the geographical positions involved meant that in any war with Russia, Austria, even if allied with France and Britain, would bear the brunt of the fighting.  On the other hand, permanent Russian control of the Danubian Principalities (later part of Romania) would greatly endanger Austria's strategic position, and the Austrians were more generally opposed to any expansion of Russian influence in the Balkans.  Thus, Buol attempted to pursue a middle course, trying to mediate between the belligerent parties.

Soon, however, this did not prove enough, and Buol, who was noted in Austria as an Anglophile, soon cast his lot more clearly with the western powers.  An ultimatum was sent to Russia to demand that it evacuate the Principalities.  The Russians agreed, and Austria occupied the Principalities for the remainder of the war.  This perceived betrayal by the Austrians insured the Tsar's undying enmity, but proved not enough to satisfy the western powers.  As the conflict dragged on into 1855, Buol sent another ultimatum to Russia, this time demanding that it accede to the French and British terms, or face a war with Austria.  This time the Russians, now under Tsar Alexander II, acceded, and preliminary peace accords were signed at Vienna later that year.

Buol's policy in the Crimean War had managed to keep Austria out of the war, but had left it badly isolated.  Russia, Austria's only reliable ally, had been completely alienated, while the French and British had not been impressed by Austria's failure to come into the war on their side, and continued to oppose Austrian influence in the Italian Kingdom of Lombardy–Venetia.  The French, eager to form an entente with the Russians in the wake of the war, also took it upon themselves to oppose Austrian projects in the Balkans. The Prussians, as always, demanded a high price in terms of Austrian acquiescence to Prussian domination of northern Germany, in exchange for any support for their German neighbors.

The consequences of this were to make themselves clear in 1859.  Now Camillo di Cavour, the Prime Minister of Sardinia-Piedmont, anxious to goad the Austrians into a war in which he knew he would have French support, engaged in a series of provocations against the Austrian position in Italy.  Although Buol and the Austrians initially seemed unperturbed, to the extent that Cavour and his ally, Emperor Napoleon III of France, feared they would not be able to have their war, Buol soon gave them what they wanted by a clumsy ultimatum demanding Piedmontese demobilization.  The Sardinian War which followed would prove disastrous for the Austrian position in Italy, but Buol himself was already dismissed in May 1859, for the missteps which had brought about the war.

Buol spent the rest of his life in retirement and died in 1865 in Vienna, aged 68.

Personal life and issue
On 26 Apr 1830 he married in Mannheim Princess Caroline von Isenburg und Büdingen zu Birstein (1809–1861), daughter of Prince Karl Theodor von Isenburg und Büdingen zu Birstein (1778–1823) and his wife, Baroness Marie Magdalene von Herding (1789–1859). They had 2 daughters:

 Countess Josephine Caroline Alexandrine Marie von Buol-Schauenstein (1835–1916), married to Lensgreve Otto Poul Julius Gustav Blome; had issue
 Countess Alexandrine von Buol-Schauenstein (1837–1901), married to Count Kálmán Hunyady de Kéthely; had issue

Honours
He received the following orders and decorations:

References

External links
 Otto

See also
 Internationalization of the Danube River

1797 births
1865 deaths
19th-century Ministers-President of Austria
Politicians from Vienna
Austrian Empire politicians
Foreign ministers of Austria
Austrian diplomats
Ambassadors of Austria to Russia
Ambassadors of Austria to the United Kingdom
Austrian people of Swiss descent
Swiss nobility
Counts of Austria
Grand Crosses of the Order of Saint Stephen of Hungary
Grand Croix of the Légion d'honneur
Knights Grand Cross of the Order of Pope Pius IX
Bailiffs Grand Cross of Honour and Devotion of the Sovereign Military Order of Malta
Knights Grand Cross of the Order of the Immaculate Conception of Vila Viçosa
Recipients of the Order of the White Eagle (Russia)